is a Japanese professional drifting driver, currently competing in the D1 Grand Prix series for Team Orange and Yuke’s.

He entered the D1 Grand Prix in the first round in 2001 and had his first win in 2003. He is a member of Team Orange with Nobushige Kumakubo and Naoto Suenaga.

Complete Drifting Results

D1 Grand Prix

Sources
JDM Option
D1 Grand Prix

Japanese racing drivers
Drifting drivers
1970 births
Living people
D1 Grand Prix drivers